Astrid Skare (17 January 1891  –  18 November 1963) was a Norwegian politician for the Labour Party.

She was born in Beitstad.

She was elected to the Norwegian Parliament from Buskerud in 1945, and was re-elected on two occasions.

References

1891 births
1963 deaths
Labour Party (Norway) politicians
Members of the Storting
Women members of the Storting
20th-century Norwegian women politicians
20th-century Norwegian politicians
People from Steinkjer